The Lewis and Clark Bridge is a cantilever bridge that spans the Columbia River between Longview, Washington, and Rainier, Oregon. At the time of its completion, it had the longest cantilever span in the United States.

The bridge was opened on March 29, 1930, as a privately owned bridge named the Longview Bridge. The $5.8 million cost (equivalent to $ million in  dollars) was recovered by tolls, $1.00 for cars and $0.10 for pedestrians (equivalent to $ for cars and $ for pedestrians in  dollars). At the time it was the longest and highest cantilever bridge in the United States. The state of Washington purchased the bridge in 1947 and the tolls were removed in 1965 after the bridge was paid for. In 1980, the bridge was rededicated as the Lewis and Clark Bridge in honor of the Lewis and Clark Expedition. The deck was replaced in 2003–04 at a cost of $29.2 million.

It was designed by Joseph Strauss, the engineer of the Golden Gate Bridge.

In 1982, the bridge was entered on the National Register of Historic Places, as the Longview Bridge. A feasibility study commissioned by the Washington State Legislature in 1990 recommended the construction of a second bridge to handle future traffic volume.

See also
Lewis and Clark River Bridge
List of bridges documented by the Historic American Engineering Record in Washington (state)
List of bridges in the United States by height
List of bridges on the National Register of Historic Places in Oregon

References

External links

Bridge chronology – The Columbia County Historian
Bridge story on HistoryLink.org

Second Longview–Rainier Bridge Feasibility Study (1990) via WSDOT Library Digital Collections

Bridges over the Columbia River
Longview, Washington
Bridges completed in 1930
Road bridges on the National Register of Historic Places in Washington (state)
National Register of Historic Places in Columbia County, Oregon
Transportation buildings and structures in Columbia County, Oregon
Road bridges on the National Register of Historic Places in Oregon
Transportation buildings and structures in Cowlitz County, Washington
Bridges by Joseph Strauss (engineer)
1930 establishments in Oregon
1930 establishments in Washington (state)
Historic American Engineering Record in Oregon
Historic American Engineering Record in Washington (state)
Former toll bridges in Oregon
Former toll bridges in Washington (state)
Cantilever bridges in the United States
Interstate vehicle bridges in the United States